An Adoption Story is a Grammy-winning classical compendium album by Kitt Wakeley (featuring Starr Parodi). The album reached No. 5 on the Billboard Classical Crossover Albums chart and features the London Symphony, Joe Satriani, and Wouter Kellerman, among others.

Background
An Adoption Story is an orchestral classical compendium album, inspired by Wakeley's time in the foster care system and as an adoptive parent of three siblings.

The album features Starr Parodi, London Symphony, Joe Satriani, and Wouter Kellerman, among others.

An Adoption Story peaked at No. 5 on the Billboard Classical Crossover Albums chart and was  featured on the Tamron Hall Show where he shared in depth about his adoption story.

Track listing

Personnel

Musicians

 Artist, composer, arranger - Kitt Wakeley 
 Piano - Starr Parodi  
 Orchestra - London Symphony 
 Violin - Isolde Faire 
 Violin - Patrick Conlon – Violin 
 Violin - Lili Haydn 
 Percussion - MB Gordy 
 Flute - Wouter Kellerman 
 Violin - Wenlan Jackson 
 Cello - Tess Remy-Schumacher 
 Trumpet - Wayne Bergeron 
 Guitar - Joe Satriani 
 Vocals - Helena Buschema 
 Harp - Kirsten Agresta Copely 
 Ancillary Percussion - Brent Berry 
 Bass Strings - Ryan Miller

Technical

 Mastering engineer - Gavin Lurssen 
 Recording engineer - John Barrett 
 Recording engineer - Tre Nagella 
 Assistant recording engineer - Patrick Conlon 
 Assistant recording engineer - Will Jones 
 Drum tracking engineer - Paige Harwell

References

2022 albums
Grammy Award-winning albums
Concept albums
Classical crossover albums
2020s classical albums